Edwin Ferdinand (born October 12, 1971) is a St. Lucian former footballer who represented the Saint Lucia national football team.

Playing career 
Ferdinand spent some time with the Caribbean Stars in the Canadian International Soccer League from 1995. During this time, the team won the 1996/1997 CISL Indoor Championship. In 1999, he signed with Northern United All Stars of the Saint Lucia Gold Division.

National team 
Ferdinand made his debut for the Saint Lucia national football team on March 5, 2000, in the 2010 FIFA World Cup qualification – CONCACAF First Round match against Suriname.

References 

1971 births
Living people
Saint Lucian footballers
Saint Lucia international footballers
Association football forwards